Aleksey Borisovich Cheremisinov (born 9 July 1985) is a Russian right-handed foil fencer, two-time team European champion, two-time individual European champion, 2014 individual world champion, two-time Olympian, and 2016 team Olympic champion.

Career
Cheremisinov took up fencing when he was seven, because there was a fencing hall close to home. His first coach was Lev Koreshkov.

Cheremisinov joined the Russia national team in 2007. He attempted to qualify for the 2008 Summer Olympics, but his defeat in the quarter-finals of the Lisbon qualifying tournament to Romania's Virgil Sălișcan ended his hopes.

At the 2012 Summer Olympics he was defeated by Italy's Andrea Baldini in the quarter-finals of the individual event. In the team event Russia fenced Germany in the first round. Cheremisinov entered the last relay with a three-hit advantage, but he could not hold the lead against Peter Joppich and Russia were defeated 40–44.

He won gold in the team event in the 2016 Summer Olympics in Rio de Janeiro, Brazil.

Medal record

Olympic Games

World Championship

European Championship

Grand Prix

World Cup

References

External links

  (archive)
  (archive)
  (archive)
 
 
 

Russian male foil fencers
Living people
Olympic fencers of Russia
Fencers at the 2012 Summer Olympics
Fencers at the 2016 Summer Olympics
Martial artists from Moscow
1985 births
Olympic medalists in fencing
Olympic gold medalists for Russia
Medalists at the 2016 Summer Olympics
Universiade medalists in fencing
Universiade gold medalists for Russia
Medalists at the 2013 Summer Universiade
21st-century Russian people